Stephen Brobeck is the director of the Consumer Federation of America.

Biography
Brobeck was born in 1944. He did undergraduate studies at Wheaton College and got his doctorate at University of Pennsylvania. In the late 1960s Brobeck was active in the opposition to the U.S. involvement in the Vietnam War. In the 1970s Brobeck was an assistant professor at Case Western Reserve University. Brobeck has published on banking and product safety.

From 1976-1979 Brobeck was on the board of the Consumer Federation of America, and from 1980 to present he has been the executive director.

Brobeck was director of the Federal Reserve Bank of Richmond from 1990-1996.

Brobeck edited the Encyclopedia of the Consumer Movement.

References

External links

Consumer rights activists
1944 births
Living people